SS Isaac Mayer Wise was a Liberty ship built in the United States during World War II. She was named after Isaac Mayer Wise, an American Reform rabbi, editor, and author.

Construction
Isaac Mayer Wise was laid down on 3 November 1944, under a Maritime Commission (MARCOM) contract, MC hull 2509, by the St. Johns River Shipbuilding Company, Jacksonville, Florida; and was launched on 6 December 1944.

History
She was allocated to the North Atlantic & Gulf Steamship Co., on 15 December 1944. On 26 December 1947, she was laid up in the James River Reserve Fleet, Lee Hall, Virginia. On 14 May 1952, she was laid up in the National Defense Reserve Fleet, Mobile, Alabama. She was sold for scrapping on 1 May 1972, to Luria Brothers & Company, for $37,100. She was removed from the fleet, 28 August 1972.

References

Bibliography

 
 
 
 

 

Liberty ships
Ships built in Jacksonville, Florida
1944 ships
James River Reserve Fleet
Mobile Reserve Fleet